The Arpinskaya Formation is a geologic formation in Armenia and Azerbaijan. It preserves fossils dated to the Wordian to Capitanian stages of the Permian period.

See also 
 List of fossiliferous stratigraphic units in Armenia
 List of fossiliferous stratigraphic units in Azerbaijan

References 

Geologic formations of Armenia
Geologic formations of Azerbaijan
Permian System of Asia
Permian Armenia
Permian Azerbaijan
Capitanian
Wordian